Procampta is a genus of butterflies in the family Hesperiidae. It consists of only one species, Procampta rara, the rare elf, which is found in Sierra Leone, Liberia, Ivory Coast, Ghana, Togo, Nigeria, Cameroon, Gabon, the Republic of the Congo, the Central African Republic, the Democratic Republic of the Congo and Uganda. The habitat consists of drier forests.

Adults mud-puddle and males are attracted to bird droppings and have been observed drinking the juices of over-ripe oranges.

References

External links
Natural History Museum Lepidoptera genus database
Seitz, A. Die Gross-Schmetterlinge der Erde 13: Die Afrikanischen Tagfalter. Plate XIII 76

Tagiadini
Monotypic butterfly genera
Hesperiidae genera